A full-course dinner is a dinner consisting of multiple dishes, or courses.  In its simplest form,  it can consist of three or four courses; for example: first course, a main course, and dessert.

Basics

A multicourse meal or full-course dinner is a meal of multiple courses, almost invariably eaten in the evening or afternoon. Most Western-world multicourse meals follow a standard sequence, influenced by traditional French haute cuisine. Each course is supposed to be designed with a particular size and genre that befits its place in the sequence. There are variations depending on location and custom. The following is a common sequence for multicourse meals:

 The meal begins with an hors d'oeuvre or appetizer, a small serving that usually does not include red meat. In Italian custom, antipasto is served, usually finger food that does not contain pasta or any starch.
 This may be followed by a variety of dishes, including a possible fish course or other light fare. The number and size of these intermittent courses is entirely dependent on local custom.
 Following these is the main course. This is the most important course and is usually the largest. 
 Next comes the salad course, although salad may often refer to a cooked vegetable, rather than the greens most people associate with the word. Note that in America since around 1960, the salad course (usually a small, simple green salad lightly dressed) is served at some point before the main course. Sometimes, the salad also accompanies the cheese course.
 The meal may carry on with a cheese selection, accompanied by an appropriate selection of wine. In many countries cheeses will be served before the meal, and in the United States often between the main course and dessert, just like in most European countries. In the UK, more typically the cheese course will follow dessert. Nuts are also a popular after-meal selection (thus the saying "from soup to nuts", meaning from beginning to end ).
 The meal will often culminate with a dessert, either hot or cold, sometimes followed with a final serving of hot or cold fruit and accompanied by a suitable dessert wine.

Meals like this are generally very formal as well as very expensive.
In formal dining, a full-course dinner can consist of 5, 6, 8, 10, 12, or 16 courses, and, in its extreme form, has been known to have 21 courses. In these more formalized dining events, the courses are carefully planned to complement each other gastronomically. The courses are smaller and spread out over a long evening, up to three, four or five hours. They follow conventions of menu planning that have been established over many years. Most courses (excluding some light courses such as sorbets) in the most formal full-course dinners are usually paired with a different wine, beer, liqueur, or other spirit.

In one modern version of service à la russe, courses are brought to the table in sequence. Only empty plates are set in front of each guest and guests make selections from a variety of dishes and fill their own plate. In another, common in restaurants, a filled plate is placed in front of a guest, pre-portioned away from the table. Often the meat is pre-portioned, but diners serve themselves with vegetables and side-dishes.  In an American formal dining course, typically each course is served sequentially. Guests are served plates already filled with food in individual portions. Often, guests have an opportunity to choose between vegetarian or meat main course. There is no opportunity to request something different or to ask for more than a single serving.

In service à la française, food is served "family-style", with all courses on the table at the same time. Guests serve themselves so that all dishes are not served at their optimum temperatures. Alternatively, buffet style is a variation of the French service where all food is available at the correct temperature in a serving space other than the dining table. Guests commute to the buffet to be served or sometimes serve themselves and then carry their plates back to the table.

Table setting

Table settings can be elaborate. More formal settings sometimes include all silverware and glassware that will be needed for the entire meal, and lay out the silverware so that the outermost tools are used for the dishes appearing earliest on the menu. In this scheme, when diners are served the first course, they can depend on finding the correct implement at the outermost edge of the arrangement.

A 13 course place setting includes multiple utensils, receptacles, and vessels.  The plate is flanked by a caviar spoon, cocktail fork, escargot fork, bouillon spoon, fish fork and knife, lobster pick, bone marrow spoon, entrée knife and fork, relevé knife and fork, saladé knife and fork. Above the place setting are laid a bread knife (on a knife rest) and plate with personal butter dish, fish bone dish, sorbet spoon, cheese knife, nut pick, and a dessert fork and spoon. To the right of the plate a salt cellar and spoon with pepper is supplied. Glassware includes a water goblet, champagne flute, white wine, red wine, dessert/sherry, and port glasses.

An alternative scheme arranges the place setting so that only the implements needed for the first one or two courses appear in the table setting. As the dinner progresses and new courses arrive, used implements are removed with the dishes, and new silverware is placed next to the plates. This scheme is commonly used when dinners are offered à la carte, so that the most appropriate implement is selected for a given course. For example, some diners may order clear, thin soups and others may order thick, creamy soups. As each of these soups has its own unique spoon, it would be considered improper and impractical to lay out a spoon that may not be needed.

Course composition

Single course meal 
 Main dish only

Two-course meal 
 Soup or Salad for Lunch/Dinner
 Main course
or 

 Main course
 Dessert

Three-course meal 
 Appetizer
 Main course (sometimes called Entree in North America)
 Dessert

Four-course meal
 Soup/Bread
 Salad
 Main Course
 Dessert

Five-course meal 
 Appetizer
 Soup
 Main course
 Dessert
 Cheese

Six-course meal 
 Hors d'oeuvres
 Soup
 Fish
 Main Course
 Salad
Coffee
 Dessert
or
 Amuse-bouche
 Soup
 Hors d'oeuvres
 Main course
 Salad
 Dessert

Example meal
The first class passengers aboard the ill-fated ocean liner  were served the following eleven-course meal in the first class dining saloon on the night of April 14, 1912:

The full course meal is also often provided as an in home dining service consisting of 7 consecutive courses, 2 appetisers or canapés & 5 plated courses - 2 entrees, 2 mains and 1 dessert. 

First course—hors d'oeuvre
 Canapés à l'Amiral (made with shrimps)
 Oysters à la Russe
 White Bordeaux, white Burgundy or chablis (especially with oysters)

Second course—soups
 Consommé Olga
 Cream of barley soup
 Madeira or sherry

Third course—fish
 Poached salmon with mousseline sauce
 Dry Rhine or moselle

Fourth course—main
 Filet mignon Lili
 Chicken Lyonnaise
 Vegetable marrow farci (that is, stuffed)
 Red Bordeaux

Fifth course—removes
 Lamb with mint sauce
 Calvados-glazed roast duckling with apple sauce
 Roast sirloin of beef forestière
 Château potatoes
 Minted green pea timbales
 Creamed carrots
 Boiled rice
 Parmentier and boiled new potatoes
 Red Burgundy or beaujolais

Sixth course—punch or sorbet
 Punch Romaine (made with rum)

Seventh course—roast
 Roasted squab on Wilted cress
 Red Burgundy

Eighth course—salad
 Asparagus salad with champagne-saffron vinaigrette

Ninth course—cold dish
 Pâté de foie gras
 Celery
 Sauterne or sweet Rhine wine

Tenth course—sweets
 Waldorf pudding
 Peaches in chartreuse jelly
 Chocolate Painted Eclairs with French vanilla cream
 French vanilla ice cream
 Sweet dessert wines (muscatel, tokay, sauterne)

Eleventh course—dessert
 Assorted fresh fruit and cheese
 Sweet dessert wines, champagne, or sparkling wine

After dinner
 Coffee, cigars
 Port or cordials

See also

Table d'hôte
Kaiseki
Italian meal structure

References

Courses (food)
Dinner